Getting His Goat is a 1915 American silent drama film directed by Jack Harvey and starring William Garwood and Violet Mersereau.

External links

1915 films
1915 comedy films
American silent short films
American black-and-white films
Films directed by Jack Harvey
1915 short films
American comedy short films
1910s American films
Silent American comedy films